Ultra Hal Assistant is a chatterbot intended to function as a personal assistant. It was developed by Zabaware, Inc.  Ultra Hal uses a natural language interface with animated characters using speech synthesis. Users can communicate with the chatterbot via typing or via a speech recognition engine.  It utilizes the WordNet lexical dictionary. Its name is an allusion to HAL 9000, the artificial intelligence from the movie 2001: A Space Odyssey.

Ultra Hal won the 2007 Loebner Prize for "most human" chatterbot.

References

Ultra Hal assistant The Tribune 4 December 2000.
 Future Net: The Essential Guide to Internet and Technology Megatrends - Jim Ensor
 Intelligent Virtual Agents: 4th International Workshop, IVA 2003
 , Computerra.

External links
Ultra Hal Assistant Webpage
What Is A Chatbot? Voicify.com

Chatbots
Human–computer interaction